Jonathan Romesh Ranganathan (born 27 March 1978) is an English actor and comedian. He is known for his deadpan and often self-deprecating comedy.

Ranganathan has made numerous appearances on television comedy panel shows, and in 2016 he co-presented It's Not Rocket Science on ITV, alongside Rachel Riley and Ben Miller. He has also been a regular panellist on The Apprentice: You're Fired!, Play to the Whistle, and The Museum of Curiosity. He completed his first major tour, Irrational Live, in 2016 in which he performed in large venues such as the Hammersmith Apollo. In 2018, Ranganathan joined A League of Their Own as a regular panellist, replacing Jack Whitehall. He has presented comedy programmes Judge Romesh and The Ranganation, as well as starring in the travel programme The Misadventures of Romesh Ranganathan. His autobiography is entitled Straight Outta Crawley. In December 2021, Ranganathan began hosting the revival of The Weakest Link, replacing Anne Robinson as host.

In 2020, Ranganathan won the BAFTA TV Award for Best Features for The Misadventures of Romesh Ranganathan; in 2021, he won the BAFTA TV Award for Best Entertainment Performance for The Ranganation.

Early life and education
Jonathan Romesh Ranganathan was born in Crawley, West Sussex, to Sri Lankan Tamil Hindu parents Ranga and Sivashanthini "Shanthi" Ranganathan. He suffered from an eye infection as a child that left him with right-sided ptosis or lazy eye.

From 1990 to 1992, Ranganathan was educated at Reigate Grammar School, an independent school (at the time one for boys, but now co-educational) in Reigate, Surrey. He then attended Hazelwick School, a state comprehensive school in Crawley in West Sussex, and went on to study Mathematics at Birkbeck College, University of London.

Ranganathan taught mathematics at his former secondary school, Hazelwick School in Crawley, and at The Beacon School, Banstead, Surrey, and was a freestyle rapper under the rap name "Ranga", once reaching the finals of the UK freestyle competition. He began performing as a comedian whilst he was employed as a teacher.

Career

Ranganathan started presenting Newsjack on Radio 4 Extra in March 2014. He appeared on The Great British Bake Off: An Extra Slice in 2014, during which he presented his homemade vegan chocolate brownies.

Ranganathan has been a guest on several episodes of 8 Out of 10 Cats Does Countdown. He also has appeared on Would I Lie to You?, Holby City, Soccer AM, Russell Howard's Good News, Sweat the Small Stuff, The Last Leg, Virtually Famous, Have I Got News for You, QI, and Mock the Week. He was a contestant on the first series of Taskmaster and also appeared in the third episode of Jon Richardson Grows Up. He also performed at The Royal Variety Performance in 2015. In 2015, he presented a series for BBC Three, Asian Provocateur, in which he travelled to Sri Lanka to explore his ancestral country.

In 2018, Ranganathan joined Season 13 of A League of Their Own and starred in his own 10-episode docu-comedy called Just Another Immigrant that premiered on Showtime June 8.

Ranganathan's autobiography, Straight Outta Crawley, was published in 2018.

Personal life
Ranganathan lives in Crawley with his wife Leesa and their three sons. He and his wife first met when they were both working at Hazelwick School, where she was a drama teacher.

Ranganathan is known by his middle name, Romesh. He did not find out until he started school that his first name, as stated on his birth certificate, was Jonathan. During his live show, Irrational, Ranganathan recalled that his parents explained to him that this was because they were concerned his name would otherwise sound too ‘ethnic’ when applying for jobs as an adult.

Ranganathan is vegan, having been vegetarian until 2013. He is a supporter of Arsenal FC. Ranganathan was raised Hindu. 

He stated that he got obsessed with getting tattooed and subsequently has tattoos with the names of his sons, Richard Pryor, Nas, the Roots, the Albanian flag and the Transformers’ Autobot logo on his body.

Filmography

Film

Television

Stand-up

Books

Guest appearances
Mock the Week (2013–2017)
The Great British Bake Off: An Extra Slice (2014)
Big Fat Quiz of the Year (2016)
Jamie and Jimmy's Friday Night Feast (2019)
Hypothetical (2019)
Jon & Lucy's Christmas Sleepover (2021)
The Jonathan Ross Show (2022)

References

External links

 
 
 
 Romesh Ranganathan: For The Love of Hip Hop (BBC Radio 2)

1978 births
20th-century English comedians
20th-century English male actors
21st-century English comedians
21st-century English male actors
alumni of Birkbeck, University of London
BBC Radio 2 presenters
comedians from West Sussex
Comic Relief people
English Hindus
English male comedians
English male film actors
English male television actors
English people of Sri Lankan Tamil descent
English stand-up comedians
living people
people from Crawley
people with ptosis (eyelid)
schoolteachers from Sussex
television personalities from West Sussex
English autobiographers